Hagensville is an unincorporated community located in Belknap Township, Presque Isle County, Michigan, United States. The commuintiy is six miles south of Rogers City, the county seat. Hagensville had a post office from 1886 to 1912 and now is a ghost town.

References

Unincorporated communities in Presque Isle County, Michigan
Unincorporated communities in Michigan